Calle Andersson (born May 16, 1994) is a Swedish professional ice hockey defenseman who is currently playing with HC Lugano of the National League (NL).  While playing with Färjestads BK in the Swedish Elitserien he was drafted as the 119th pick in the 2012 NHL Entry Draft by the New York Rangers. He is the son of former New York Rangers player, Peter Andersson.

Playing career
On June 2, 2014, Andersson was signed to a three-year entry-level contract with the Rangers. In the 2014–15 season, Andersson left the Swedish leagues, and was loaned by the Rangers to the Swiss National League A with EV Zug and later HC Lugano. After a successful stint with Lugano, it was announced that Andersson would cross the Pacific, and begin his North American career in the Rangers organization the following season.

In the midst of his second season with the Wolf Pack in 2016–17, Andersson posted 3 assists in just 4 games before he consented to a mutual termination of his contract with the Rangers on November 3, 2016. As a free agent, Andersson opted to return to the Swiss NLA, agreeing to a two-year deal with SC Bern on November 24, 2016.

Following six seasons with SC Bern, Andersson left the club and continued his tenure in the Swiss National League, signing a four-year contract in a return with HC Lugano on 28 March 2022 beginning in the 2022–23 season.

Career statistics

Regular season and playoffs

International

Awards and honours

References

External links

1994 births
Living people
SC Bern players
Färjestad BK players
Hartford Wolf Pack players
HC Lugano players
Malmö Redhawks players
New York Rangers draft picks
Swedish ice hockey defencemen
EV Zug players
Sportspeople from Malmö